Abdullah Adil (born 7 February 1994) is an Afghan first-class cricketer. He competed at the 2014 Asian Games. He made his List A debut for Afghanistan A against Zimbabwe A during their tour to Zimbabwe on 27 January 2017. He made his Twenty20 debut for Speen Ghar Tigers in the 2017 Shpageeza Cricket League on 17 September 2017.

References

External links
 

1994 births
Living people
Afghan cricketers
Place of birth missing (living people)
Asian Games medalists in cricket
Cricketers at the 2014 Asian Games
Band-e-Amir Dragons cricketers
Spin Ghar Tigers cricketers
Asian Games silver medalists for Afghanistan
Medalists at the 2014 Asian Games